Francisco Planas Garcia (born 6 April 1908) was a Cuban chess player. He was the winner of the Cuban Chess Championship in 1927 and 1929. Planas was born in Matanzas, Cuba.

References

Further reading
 Revista Cubana de Ajedrez, April 1938, p. 9–10
 Jacque Mate, March 1975, cover d

1908 births
Date of death missing
Cuban chess players
Sportspeople from Matanzas